Thomas Hanselmann (born 21 April 1976) is a former Liechtenstein football defender.

Making his debut against Macedonia in 1996, Hanselmann would go on to win 25 caps and score one goal for his country. He last played at the club level for FC Chur 97.

References

Liechtenstein international footballers
FC Vaduz players
FC Chur 97 players
Liechtenstein footballers
1976 births
Living people
FC Balzers players
Association football defenders